is a passenger railway station located in  south-east Yamakita, Kanagawa, Japan, operated by Central Japan Railway Company (JR Central).

Lines
Yamakita Station is served by the Gotemba Line and is 15.9 kilometers from the terminus of the line at Kōzu Station

Station layout
Yamakita Station was built with two island platforms, but now has only a single island platform. A set of tracks outside the southern track is used for parking trains at night, when not in use. The station is staffed during daylight hours. A JNR Class D52 steam locomotive is preserved in a park near the station.

Platforms

History
Yamakita Station opened on February 1, 1889 on the Japanese National Railways (JNR) line linking Kōzu Station and Shizuoka Station. The steep gradient of the line in this area necessitated the use of bank engines, and Yamakita Station developed as a center for the maintenance and refueling of these engines. It was designated a station of the Tōkaidō Main Line on November 12, 1909. However, with the opening of the Tanna Tunnel and the development of more powerful steam locomotives, Yamakita Station gradually decreased in importance. It was designated a station on the Gotemba Line from December 1, 1934. The Yamakita Locomotive Depot was abolished on May 15, 1943. Freight services were discontinued on March 31, 1979 and small parcel services from February 1, 1984. On April 1, 1987 along with privatization and division of JNR, the station came under control of JR Central.

Station numbering was introduced to the Gotemba Line in March 2018; Yamakita Station was assigned station number CB06.

Passenger statistics
In fiscal 2018, the station was used by an average of 561 passengers daily (boarding passengers only).

The passenger figures (boarding passengers only) for previous years are as shown below.

Bus services 
 Fujikyu Shonan Bus 
 for Nishi Tanzawa via Lake Tanzawa and Nakagawa Onsen
 for Shin-Matsuda Station (Odakyu Odawara Line) via Yamakita Station (JR Central)

Surrounding area
Lake Tanzawa
Yamakita Railway Park
Yamakita Town Hall
Yamakita Town Central Public Hall

Bus services 
 Fujikyu Shonan Bus
 for Nishi Tanzawa via Yaga Station, Lake Tanzawa and Nakagawa Onsen
 for Shin-Matsuda Station (Odakyu Odawara Line)

See also
List of railway stations in Japan

References

External links

 Gotemba Line Users' Association information 

Railway stations in Japan opened in 1889
Yamakita, Kanagawa